The Venetian regional election of 1970 took place on 7–8 June 1970.

Events
Christian Democracy was by far the largest party, securing a full majority. After the election the Christian Democrats formed a one-party government under the leadership of Angelo Tomelleri, who was briefly replaced by Paolo Feltrin in 1972–1973.

Results

Source: Regional Council of Veneto

References

Elections in Veneto
1970 elections in Italy